Bakari Ward (born November 26, 1998), known professionally as Scorey or Scorey Ayee, is an American rapper from Syracuse, New York. He was the first artist signed to Only Dreamers Achieve Records in 2020, a record label created by Chicago rapper Polo G. Scorey describes Polo G as a mentor to him and he has been described as a protégé of Polo G.

Early life 
Ward grew up listening to rappers such as Lil Wayne, G Herbo and 50 Cent. He mimicked their style and freestyled with his friends. He began recording music in 2018 and taking it seriously in 2019.

During his childhood he enjoyed playing basketball and played on a basketball team either from a club or school.

Ward's music is often influenced by his deceased friends. This includes a friend named Leah, who is referenced multiple times in his songs. In addition, he references Zachary “Zuly” Holloway, who is featured in many of his early music videos. Ward's song "Victim" is filmed at a gathering for Holloway's passing.

When Ward was 21, he nearly died after taking fake Percocet pills that contained fentanyl. He was rushed to the hospital after he blacked out, and has since quit taking Percocet.

Career 
Scorey's debut single "Freddie Krueger", released on September 1, 2019, caught the attention of rapper Polo G who saw it posted on a friends Instagram story who was signed to the same label as Scorey. From there Polo G contacted him on Instagram. Days later, Polo G invited him to perform with him at Webster Hall in New York City, as part of his Die a Legend tour, along with rappers such as Yungeen Ace, Luh Kel, and Toosii. It was at this point that he also quit his summer job at Green Lakes State Park, which helped pay for his studio sessions and videomaking.

During the recording session for Scorey's single "Moods", Polo G asked him to join his startup record label Only Dreamers Achieve, a partnership with Columbia Records. He accepted and became the first artist signed to the label. His single "Dior You" was the first release under the record label, released on March 12, 2021. He later featured in Polo G's third studio album Hall of Fame released in June 2021.

Discography

Studio albums

Extended Plays

Singles

As Lead Artist

As Featured Artist

Guest Appreances

References

Living people
Rappers from New York (state)
African-American male rappers
21st-century American rappers
21st-century American male musicians
21st-century African-American musicians
1998 births